Mademoiselle Midnight is a 1924 American silent drama film starring Mae Murray and directed by Murray's then husband, Robert Z. Leonard. The film was written by Carl Harbaugh and John Russell. The film was the final release of Metro under the Tiffany Productions banner, owned by the couple. A complete print of the film survives.

The film depicts a love triangle between a Mexican heiress (granddaughter of a French exile), an American traveler, and a local outlaw.

Plot
Renée (Mae Murray) is the heiress of a Mexican ranch, granddaughter of a woman known for her recklessness and frivolity at night. This first "Mademoiselle Midnight" is banished in the opening scene by Napoleon III at Eugénie de Montijo's insistence to Mexico.  Renee is kept locked at the hacienda at night by her father to prevent her following in her grandmother's wayward footsteps.  She falls in love with a visiting American (Monte Blue) but is also pursued by the craven outlaw Manuel Corrales. Miss Murray gets to do some of her trademark dancing, but this one isn't a comedy, despite comic relief provided by Johnny Arthur.

Cast

References

External links

1924 films
1924 comedy films
American comedy films
American silent feature films
American black-and-white films
Films directed by Robert Z. Leonard
Films set in Mexico
Tiffany Pictures films
Cultural depictions of Napoleon III
1920s American films
Films with screenplays by John Russell (screenwriter)
Films about outlaws
Silent American comedy films